The Jurisdiction in Liberties Act 1535 (27 Hen 8 c 24) was an Act of the Parliament of England curtailing the independent jurisdiction of liberties and counties palatine, bringing them more in line with the royal government of the shires. It was promoted by Thomas Cromwell. The geographical area of many of the liberties corresponded to monasteries which were to be dissolved. Opposition to the Act was a factor in the Pilgrimage of Grace revolt in Yorkshire in 1536.

The Laws in Wales Act 1535 similarly abolished the Marcher Lordships of Wales. In the Lordship of Ireland, the 1537 Act of Absentees had similarities, extinguishing the palatine privileges of English absentee lords whose undergoverned lands had provided succour to Silken Thomas' 1534 rebellion.

Provisions

Notes

References
Halsbury's Statutes,

Acts of the Parliament of England (1485–1603)
1535 in law
1535 in England